Missy Elliott is an American rapper, singer, and record producer. Her debut album Supa Dupa Fly was released on July 15, 1997, in the United States under her own label The Goldmind Inc. signed under Elektra Records. Her second album Da Real World was then released on June 22, 1999, followed by her third album Miss E... So Addictive, released on May 15, 2001. Under Construction was the fourth album released by Elliott, which was released on November 12, 2002, followed by her fifth album This Is Not a Test! that saw a release on November 25, 2003, and The Cookbook, Elliott's latest album to date, which was released on July 4, 2005.

Throughout Missy Elliott's career, she has received several awards and nominations. Her debut, Supa Dupa Fly (1997) and the single "The Rain (Supa Dupa Fly)" would go on to score two Grammy nominations for Best Rap Album and Best Rap Solo Performance, alongside three MTV Music Video Awards nominations for "Best Direction in a Video," "Best Breakthrough Video" & "Best Rap Video".

Missy Elliott's second album Da Real World (1999) attained a Grammy nomination for Best Rap Album. She also received an award for "Best R&B/Soul or Rap Music Video" by the Soul Train Awards. The album went platinum in the US, making it Elliott's second platinum album. The follow-up, Miss E... So Addictive (2001), was also a commercial success. This album would attain twelve MTV Video Music Awards nominations throughout 2001 and 2002. Additionally, the effort gained Elliott several nominations from various award shows some including, the Grammy Awards, MTV Video Music Awards, and the BET Awards.

On March 27, 2001, Lil' Kim, Christina Aguilera, Pink, and Mýa recorded a cover version of the LaBelle song, "Lady Marmalade" as a medley for the feature film Moulin Rouge! that Missy Elliott produced, which topped the Billboard Hot 100 for seven weeks.

Missy Elliott's fourth album Under Construction (2002) was certified double platinum, making it her fourth platinum album. The effort gained Elliott eight MTV Video Music Awards in 2003, taking two awards for "Video of the Year & "Best Hip-Hop Video". The album also gained Elliott five Grammy nominations in 2004 for Best Rap Performance by a Duo or Group, Best Rap Album, Album of The Year, Best Rap Song & Best Female Rap Solo Performance taking an award for Best Female Rap Solo Performance. Elliott's follow-up This Is Not a Test! (2003) would also attain a platinum certification, as well as two MTV Video Music Awards and one MTV Music Video Japan Awards nominations.

The Cookbook (2005) is Missy Elliott's latest album to date. The effort attained three Grammy nominations in 2006 for Best Short Form Music Video, Best Rap Song & Best Rap Album. Elliott received the award for Best Short Form Music Video for her single "Lose Control". The Cookbook also gained Elliott seven MTV Video Music Awards nominations, taking two awards for "Best Dance Video" and "Best Hip-Hop Video". In 2014, Missy Elliott became nominated for a Grammy for Best R&B Song for the featured single, "Without Me".

American Music Awards
The American Music Awards is an annual music awards ceremony and one of several major annual American music awards shows. is an annual music awards ceremony and one of several major annual American music awards shows. 

|-
| style="text-align:center;" rowspan="2"|2003 	
| style="text-align:center;"| Herself
| style="text-align:center;"| Favorite Rap/Hip-Hop Female Artist
|
|-
| style="text-align:center;"| "Under Construction" 
| style="text-align:center;"| Favorite Rap/Hip-Hop Album 
|
|-
| style="text-align:center;" rowspan="1"|2005
| style="text-align:center;"| Herself
| style="text-align:center;"| Favorite Rap/Hip-Hop Female Artist
|
|}

ASCAP

ASCAP Film and Television Music Awards

|-
| align="center" |2002
| align="center" |" On"
| align="center" |Most Performed Songs from Motion Pictures
|
|-
|}

ASCAP Pop Music Awards

|-
| align="center" |2004
| align="center" |"Work It"
| align="center" |Award Winning Songs
|
|-
| align="center" rowspan="2"|2006
| align="center" rowspan="1"|"1, 2 Step" (with Ciara)
| align="center" rowspan="3"| Most Performed Songs
|
|-
| align="center" |"Lose Control"
|
|-
| style="text-align:center;"| 2008
| style="text-align:center;"| "Let It Go" (with Keyshia Cole & Lil' Kim)
|
|}

ASCAP Rhythm & Soul Awards

|-
|style="text-align:center;" rowspan="1"|1998
| align="center" rowspan="1"| "Not Tonight" (with Lisa "Left Eye" Lopes of TLC, Da Brat, Angie Martinez, Lil' Kim)
| align="center" rowspan="1"| Top R&B/Hip-Hop Song
| 
|-
| align="center"|1999
| align="center"|"Make It Hot" (with Nicole Wray, Timbaland, Mocha)
| align="center"|Award-Winning R&B Songs
| 
|-
| align="center"|2000
| align="center"|"Where My Girls At?" (with 702, co-written and co-produced by Missy Elliott)
| align="center"|Top R&B/Hip-Hop Song
|
|-
| align="center" rowspan="2"|2001
| align="center" rowspan="2|"Hot Boyz"
| align="center" rowspan="1"| R&S Award-Winning R&B/Hip-Hop Songs
| 
|-
| align="center" rowspan="1"| Top Rap Song
| 
|-
| align="center" rowspan="1"|2002
| align="center" rowspan="1"|"Get Ur Freak On"
| align="center" rowspan="2"| Top R&B/Hip-Hop Song
|
|-
| align="center" rowspan="3"|2003
| align="center" rowspan="1"|"Work It"
|
|-
| align="center" rowspan="1"|"Gossip Folks" (featuring Ludacris)
| align="center" rowspan="2"| Top R&B/Hip-Hop Song
|
|-
| align="center" rowspan="2"|"So Gone" (with Monica, produced and written by Missy Elliott)
|
|-
| align="center" rowspan="3"|2004
| align="center" rowspan="1"| Award Winning R&B/Hip Hop Songs
|
|-
| align="center" rowspan="1"| "Work It"
| align="center" rowspan="2"| Award Winning Rap Songs
|
|-
|align="center" rowspan="1"| "Gossip Folks"
|
|-
|align="center" rowspan="2"|2006
|align="center"|"1, 2 Step" (with Ciara)
|align="center" rowspan="3"| Award Winning R&B/Hip Hop Songs
|
|-
|align="center"|"Free Yourself" (with Fantasia)
|
|-
|style="text-align:center;" rowspan="2"|2008
| align="center" rowspan="1"| "Let It Go"  (with Keyshia Cole & Lil' Kim) 
|
|-
|}

Berklee College of Music

|-
| align="center" |2019
| align="center" |"Missy Elliott"
| align="center" |Honorary Doctorate
|
|-
|}

BET

BET Awards
Missy Elliott has won 6 BET Awards including 5 times for 'Best Female Hip-Hop Artist'.

|-
|rowspan="1"|2001
| align="center" rowspan="2"|Herself
| align="center" rowspan="2"|Best Female Hip-Hop Artist
|
|-
| align="center" rowspan="2"|2002
|
|-
| align="center"|"One Minute Man"
| align="center" rowspan="2"|Video of the Year
|
|-
| align="center" rowspan="4"|2003
| align="center" rowspan="2"|"Work It
|
|-
| align="center"|Viewer's Choice
|
|-
| align="center"|"Gossip Folks"
| align="center"|Best Collaboration
|
|-
| align="center" rowspan="2"|Herself
| align="center" rowspan="2"|Best Female Hip-Hop Artist
|
|-
| align="center"  rowspan="1"|2004
|
|-
| align="center" rowspan="2"|2005
| align="center" rowspan="2"|"1, 2 Step" (with Ciara)
| align="center"| Viewer's Choice
| 
|-
| align="center" rowspan="2"| Best Collaboration
| 
|-
| align="center" rowspan="3"|2006
| align="center"|"Touch It" (with Busta Rhymes)
| 
|-
| align="center"| "Lose Control"
| align="center"| Video of the Year
| 
|-
| align="center" rowspan="2"|Herself
| align="center" rowspan="2"|Best Female Hip-Hop Artist
| 
|-
| align="center" rowspan="3"|2008
|
|-
| align="center" rowspan="2"|"Let It Go" (with Keyshia Cole & Lil' Kim)
| align="center"|Best Collaboration
|
|-
| align="center"| Viewer's Choice
|
|-
| align="center" rowspan="1"|2010
| align="center" rowspan="3"|Herself
| align="center"| Best Female Hip-Hop Artist
|
|-
| align="center" rowspan="1"|2016
| align="center"| Best Female Hip-Hop Artist
|
|-
| align="center" rowspan="1"|2017
| align="center"| Best Female Hip-Hop Artist
|
|-
|}

BET Hip-Hop Awards

|-
| align="center" rowspan="3"|2006
| align="center" | "Lose Control" (with Missy Elliott)
| align="center" |  Best Hip-Hop Collaboration
| 
|-
| align="center" | Herself
| align="center" | Best Hot Ticket Performer
| 
|-
| align="center" | "Touch It" (with Busta Rhymes)
| align="center" |  Best Hip-Hop Collaboration
| 
|-
| align="center" rowspan="1"|2009
| align="center" |  Herself
| align="center" |  Salute to the Sisters of Hip-Hop Honor
| 
|-
| align="center" rowspan="1"|2021
| align="center" |  Herself
| align="center" |  Video Director of the Year
| 
|}

Black Girls Rock! Awards

|-
|rowspan="1"|2007
|rowspan="2" align="center"|Herself
| align="center"|Creative Visionary
|
|-
|rowspan="1"|2010
| align="center"|Visionary
|
|-
|}

Billboard Music Awards

Billboard Music Awards & Billboard R&B/Hip-Hop Awards

|-
| style="text-align:center;" rowspan="1"|2001
| style="text-align:center;"| Herself
| style="text-align:center;"| Female R&B/Hip-Hop Artist of the Year
|
|-
| style="text-align:center;" rowspan="2"|2003 	
| style="text-align:center;"| Herself
| style="text-align:center;"| Top Female R&B/Hip-Hop Artist of the Year
|
|-
| style="text-align:center;"| "Work It" 
| style="text-align:center;"| Hot Rap Track	
|
|-
| style="text-align:center;" rowspan="2"|2005
| style="text-align:center;"| Herself
| style="text-align:center;"| Hot 100 Airplay of the Year
|
|-
| style="text-align:center;"| "1, 2 Step" 
| style="text-align:center;"| Ringtone of the Year
|
|}

Billboard's Women in Music Awards
The Billboard Women in Music Awards is an annual awards ceremony presented by Billboard magazine. Elliott was honored with an award on its 10th edition.

|-
| align="center"| 2015
|align="center"| Herself
|align="center"| Innovator 
| 
|-
|}

Brit Awards

|-
| align="center" rowspan="1"|1999
| align="center" rowspan="1"|I Want You Back ft. Mel B
| align="center" rowspan="1"|Video of the Year
|
|-
| align="center" rowspan="1"|2003
| align="center" rowspan="3"|Herself
| align="center" rowspan="3"| Best International Female
| 
|-
|rowspan="1"|2004
| 
|-
|rowspan="1"|2006
| 
|}

DanceStar Awards

|-
| style="text-align:center;"|2003
| style="text-align:center;"|"4 My People"
| style="text-align:center;"| Best Video
|
|-
|}

EME Awards

|-
|align="center" rowspan="1"|2009
|align="center" rowspan="1"|Herself (with John Legend)
|align="center" rowspan="1"|Friend of Reggae
|
|}

Essence Black Women In Music

|-
|align="center" rowspan="1"|2018
|align="center" rowspan="1"|Missy Elliott
|align="center" rowspan="1"|Visionary Award
|
|}

Grammy Awards
Missy Elliott has received four Grammy Awards: 3 for her solo rap career ("Get Ur Freak On," "Scream aka Itchin" and "Work It"), and 1 for her music video work ("Lose Control"). Her nominations span three consecutive decades. In total, Elliott's six studio albums garnered 22 nominations. Five of six of Elliott's albums were nominated in any Grammy category, and four received Best Rap Album nominations.

|-
|rowspan="3"|1998
| "Not Tonight (Ladies Night)"  (with Lil' Kim, Angie Martinez, Da Brat & Lisa "Left Eye" Lopes of TLC)
|Best Rap Performance by a Duo or Group
|
|-
|"The Rain (Supa Dupa Fly)"
|Best Rap Solo Performance
|
|-
|Supa Dupa Fly
|Best Rap Album
|
|-
|rowspan="1"|2000
|Da Real World
|Best Rap Album
|
|-
|rowspan="3"|2002
|"One Minute Man"
| Best Short Form Music Video
| 
|-
|rowspan="2"|"Get Ur Freak On"
|Best R&B Song
|
|-
|Best Rap Solo Performance
| 
|-
|rowspan="2"|2003
|"The Knoc" (with Dr. Dre & Knoc-turn'al)
| Best Short Form Music Video
| 
|-
|"Scream a.k.a. Itchin"
|Best Female Rap Solo Performance
| 
|-
|rowspan="5"|2004
|"Gossip Folks" (featuring Ludacris)
|Best Rap Performance by a Duo or Group
|
|-
|rowspan="2"|Under Construction
|Best Rap Album
| 
|-
|Album of the Year
|
|-
|rowspan="2"| "Work It" 
| Best Rap Song
| 
|-
|Best Female Rap Solo Performance
| 
|-
|rowspan="5"|2006
| "1, 2 Step" (with Ciara)
| Best Rap/Sung Collaboration
|
|-
|rowspan="1"|"Free Yourself" (with Fantasia Barrino)
| Best R&B Song
|
|-
|rowspan="2"|"Lose Control" (featuring Ciara & Fatman Scoop)
| Best Rap Song
|
|-
| Best Short Form Music Video
| 
|-
|The Cookbook
|Best Rap Album
|
|-
|rowspan="1"|2007
| "We Run This"
| Best Rap Solo Performance
|
|-
|rowspan="1"|2008
| "Let It Go" (with Keyshia Cole & Lil' Kim)
| Best Rap/Sung Collaboration
|
|-
|rowspan="1"|2014
| "Without Me" (with Fantasia & Kelly Rowland)
| Best R&B Song
|
|}

Hollywood Walk of Fame

|-
|2021
| Missy Elliott
|Induction to the pass of fame
|
|}

Songwriters Hall of Fame
The songwriters hall of fame brings together composer prodigies. 

|-
|2021
| Missy Elliott
|The first rapper in the hall of fame
|
|-
|}

Hungarian Music Awards
The Hungarian Music Awards have been given to artists in the field of Hungarian music since 1992. The award categories are similar to Grammy Awards in the United States and Brit Awards in the United Kingdom.
The awards were known as the Golden Giraffe Awards until 2003. Missy Elliott has won 1 award.

|-
|2002
|Miss E... So Addictive
|Best International Rap/Hip-Hop Album
|
|}

International Dance Music Awards

|-
|rowspan="1" |2002
| "Get Ur Freak On"
|rowspan="2" |Best Rap/Hip-Hop Track
|
|-
|rowspan="1" |2003
| "Work It"
|
|-
|rowspan="1" |2004
| "Pass That Dutch"
| Best Dance Video
| 
|-
|rowspan="3" |2006
|rowspan="3" |"Lose Control"
| Best R&B/Urban Dance Track
| 
|-
| Best Rap/Hip Hop Dance Track
| 
|-
| Best Dance Video
|
|}

MTV

MTV Asia Awards

|-
| style="text-align:center;"| 2002
| style="text-align:center;"| "Lady Marmalade" 
| style="text-align:center;"| Favorite Video 
| 
|}

MTV Music Video Japan Awards

|-
|rowspan="1"|2002
|"Lady Marmalade" (with Mýa, Pink, Lil' Kim, Christina Aguilera)
|Best Video from a Film
|
|-
|rowspan="1"|2003
|Work It
|Best Hip-Hop Video
| 
|-
|rowspan="4"|2004
|This Is Not a Test!
|Album of the Year
| 
|-
|Pass That Dutch
|Video of the Year
| 
|-
|Pass That Dutch
|Best Hip-Hop Video
| 
|-
|Herself
|Best Live Performance
| 
|-
|rowspan="1"|2005
| "Car Wash" (with Christina Aguilera)
| Best Video from a Film
|
|-
|rowspan="1"|2006
| "Lose Control"
| Best Collaboration
|
|-
|}

MTV Europe Awards

|-
|align="center"|1998
|align="center" rowspan="3"| Herself
| Best Rap
| 
|-
|rowspan="1"|2000
| Best Hip-Hop Artist
| 
|-
|rowspan="1"|2001
| Best Hip-Hop Artist
| 
|-
|rowspan="2"|2003
|align="center"| "Work It"
| Best Video 
| 
|- 
|align="center" rowspan="4"| Herself
| Best Hip-Hop Artist
| 
|-
|rowspan="2"|2005
| Best Female Artist
| 
|-
| Best Hip-Hop Artist
| 
|-
|rowspan="1"|2006
| Best Hip-Hop Artist
| 
|-
|}

MTV Video Music Awards
The MTV Video Music Awards (VMAs) is an award show by the cable network MTV to honor the top music videos of the year. It was first held at the end of the summer of 1984, and originally as an alternative to the Grammy Award in the video category. Missy Elliott has won 15 VMAs out of 45 nominations.

|-
| rowspan="3" align="center"|1997
| rowspan="3" align="center"| "The Rain (Supa Dupa Fly)"
| align="center"|Best Direction in a Video
|
|-
| align="center"|Breakthrough Video
|
|-
| align="center"|Best Rap Video
|
|-
| rowspan="12" align="center"|2001
| rowspan="6" align="center"| "Get Ur Freak On"
| align="center"|Best Cinematography in a Video
|
|-
|align="center"|Best Editing in a Video
|
|-
|align="center"|Best Special Effects in a Video
|
|-
|align="center"|Best Hip Hop Video
|
|-
| align="center"|Best Female Video
|
|- 
| align="center"| Video of the Year
|
|-
| rowspan="6" align="center"| "Lady Marmalade"
| align="center"|Best Art direction in a Video
|
|-
|align="center"|Best Video from a film 
|
|-
|align="center"|Best Choreography in a Video
|
|-
|align="center"|Best Dance Video
|
|-
| align="center"|Best Pop Video
|
|- 
| align="center"| Video of the Year
|
|-
| rowspan="6" align="center"|2002
| rowspan="6" align="center"| "One Minute Man" (with Ludacris and Trina)
| align="center"| Best Cinematography in a Video
|
|-
| align="center"|Best Editing in a Video
|
|-
| align="center"|Best Art Direction in a Video
|
|-
| align="center"|Best Special Effects in a Video
|
|-
| align="center"|Best Direction in a Video
|
|-
| align="center"|Best Hip-Hop Video
|
|-
| rowspan="8" align="center"|2003
| rowspan="8" align="center"| "Work It"
| align="center"|Best Cinematography in a Video
|
|-
| align="center"|Best Art Direction in a Video
|
|-
| align="center"|Best Editing in a Video
|
|-
| align="center"|Best Direction in a Video
|
|-
| align="center"|Best Special Effects in a Video
|
|-
| align="center"|Best Hip-Hop Video
|
|-
| align="center"|Best Female Video
|
|-
| align="center"|Video of the Year
|
|-
| rowspan="2" align="center"|2004
| rowspan="2" align="center"| "I'm Really Hot"
| align="center"|Best Dance Video
|
|-
| align="center"|Best Choreography in a Video
|
|-
| rowspan="7" align="center"|2005
| rowspan="6" align="center"| "Lose Control"
| align="center"|Best Special Effects in a Video
|
|-
| align="center"|Best Choreography in a Video
|
|-
| align="center"|Best Direction in a Video
|
|-
| align="center"|Breakthrough Video
|
|-
| align="center"|Best Dance Video
|
|-
| align="center"|Best Hip-Hop Video
|
|-
| rowspan="1" align="center"| "1,2 Step (with Ciara)"
| align="center"|Best New Artist in a Video
|
|-
| align="center"|2006
| align="center"| "We Run This"
| align="center"|Best Special Effects in a Video
|
|-
| align="center"|2008
| align="center"| "Ching-a-Ling"/"Shake Your Pom Pom 3D"
| align="center"|Best Special Effects
|
|-
| rowspan="1" align="center"|2016
| rowspan="1" align="center"| "WTF (Where They From)" 
| align="center"|Best Choreography
|
|-
| 2019
| align="center"|Missy Elliot
| Michael Jackson Video Vanguard Award
| 
|}

MOBO Awards

|-
|rowspan="1" align="center"|1997
|rowspan="1" align="center"| "The Rain (Supa Dupa Fly)"
| align="center"|Best Video
|
|-
|rowspan="1" align="center"|1998
|rowspan="2" align="center"| Herself
| align="center"|Best International Act
|
|-
|rowspan="2" align="center"|2001
| align="center"|Best Hip-Hop Act
|
|-
| align="center"| "Get Ur Freak On"
|align="center"| Best Single
|
|-
|}

MuchMusic Video Awards

|-
|align="center" rowspan="1"|2003
|align="center" rowspan="1"|"Work It"
|align="center" rowspan="2"| Best International Video – Artist
|
|-
| align="center"| 2004
| align="center"| "Pass That Dutch"
|
|-
|}

NAACP Awards

|-
|align="center"|1999
|align="center" rowspan="1"|Herself
|align="center"|Outstanding Rap Artist
|
|-
|align="center" rowspan="2"|2002 
|rowspan="1" align="center"|"Work It"
|rowspan="1" align="center"| Outstanding Song
|
|-
|align="center" rowspan="3"|Herself
|align="center" rowspan="2"|Outstanding Female Artist
|
|-
|rowspan="1" align="center"|2003
| 
|-
|rowspan="1" align="center"|2013
| align="center"|Outstanding Female Artist
|
|-
|rowspan="1" align="center"|2021
|rowspan="1" align="center"|"Cool Off"
|rowspan="1" align="center"|Outstanding Hip Hop/Rap Song
|
|}

NME Awards

|-
|rowspan="1"|2002
|Herself
|Best Hip Hop/Rap Act
| 
|}

Nickelodeon Kids' Choice Awards

|-
|rowspan="1"|2006
| "1, 2 Step" (with Ciara)
| Favorite Song
| 
|}

People's Choice Awards

|-
|rowspan="2"|2005
|rowspan="2"|"Car Wash" (with Christina Aguilera)
| Favorite Remake
| 
|-
|Favorite Combined Forces
|
|-
|}

Shorty Awards
The Shorty Awards, also known as the "Shortys", is an annual awards show recognizing the people and organizations that produce real-time short form content across Twitter, Facebook, Tumblr, YouTube, Instagram and the rest of the social web. Missy Elliott has received one nomination.

|-
|2020
|Herself
|Best in Music (Arts & Entertainment)
|
|}

Soul Train

Soul Train Music Awards

|-
|rowspan="2"|1998
|"One in a Million" (with Aaliyah)
|Best R&B/Soul Single
|
|-
|"The Rain (Supa Dupa Fly)"
|Best R&B/Soul or Rap Music Video
|
|-
|rowspan="1"|2002
|"Get Ur Freak On"
|Best R&B/Soul or Rap Music Video
|
|-
|rowspan="1"|2003
|"Work It"
|Best R&B/Soul or Rap Music Video
|
|-
|rowspan="2"|2006
|rowspan="2"|"Lose Control"
|Best R&B/Soul or Rap Dance Cut
|
|-
|Best R&B/Soul or Rap Music Video
|
|}

Soul Train Lady of Soul Awards

|-
| align="center" rowspan="1"|1998
| align="center"|"Not Tonight" (with Lil' Kim)
| align="center"|Best Video by a Female
| 
|-
| align="center" rowspan="1"|1999
| align="center"|"Where My Girls At?" (with 702)
| align="center"|Best R&B/Soul Single - Group, Band or Duo
| 
|-
| align="center" rowspan="1"|2000
| align="center"|"Hot Boyz"
| align="center" rowspan="4"|Best R&B/Soul or Rap Music Video
| 
|-
| align="center" rowspan="1"|2001
| align="center"|"Get Ur Freak On"
| 
|-
| align="center" rowspan="1"|2002
| align="center"|"One Minute Man"
| 
|-
| align="center" rowspan="2"|2003
| align="center" rowspan="2"|"Work It"
|
|-
| align="center"|R&B/Soul or Rap Song of the Year
|
|-
| align="center" rowspan="2"|2005
| align="center"| "1, 2 Step (with Ciara)
| align="center"| Best R&B/Soul or Rap Dance Cut
| 
|-
| align="center"| "Lose Control"
| align="center"| Best R&B/Soul or Rap Music Video
| 
|- 
|}

SPIN Awards

|-
|rowspan="1"|2004
| Herself (with Cat Power)
| Best Solo Artist
| 
|}

Teen Choice Awards

|-
| style="text-align:center;" rowspan="3"|2001
| style="text-align:center;"|Herself
| style="text-align:center;"|Choice Music: R&B/Hip-Hop Artist
| 
|-
| style="text-align:center;" rowspan="2"|"Get Ur Freak On"
| style="text-align:center;"|Choice Music: R&B/Hip-Hop Track
| 
|-
|-
| style="text-align:center;"|Choice Music: Dance Track
| 
|-
| style="text-align:center;" rowspan="1"|2002
| style="text-align:center;"| "Oops (Oh My)"
| style="text-align:center;"| Choice Music: R&B/Hip-Hop Track
| 
|-
| style="text-align:center;" rowspan="3"|2003
| style="text-align:center;" rowspan="2"|Herself
| style="text-align:center;"|Choice Music: Female Artist
|
|-
| style="text-align:center;"| Choice Music: Rap Artist
|
|-
| style="text-align:center;"| "Work It"
| style="text-align:center;"| Choice Music Single
|
|-
| style="text-align:center;" rowspan="2"| 2004
| style="text-align:center;" rowspan="2"| Herself
| style="text-align:center;"| Choice Music: Rap Artist
|
|-
| style="text-align:center;"|Choice Music: Tour
|
|-
| style="text-align:center;" rowspan="1"|2005
| style="text-align:center;"| Choice TV Personality: Female
| style="text-align:center;"| Herself
| 
|-
| style="text-align:center;"|2006
| style="text-align:center;" | Herself
| style="text-align:center;"| Choice Music: Rap Artist
| 
|-
|}

TMF

TMF Belgium Awards

|-
| style="text-align:center;"|2001
| style="text-align:center;"| "Lady Marmalade" (with Christina Aguilera, Pink & Mýa)
| style="text-align:center;"| Video of the Year 
| 
|}

TMF Netherlands Awards

|-
| style="text-align:center;"|2001
| style="text-align:center;"| "Lady Marmalade" (with Christina Aguilera, Pink & Mýa)
| style="text-align:center;"| Video of the Year 
| 
|}

VH1 Awards

|-
| style="text-align:center;" rowspan="3"|2001
| style="text-align:center;" rowspan="3"| "Lady Marmalade" (with Christina Aguilera, Pink & Mýa)
| style="text-align:center;"| My VH1 Favorite Video
| 
|-
| style="text-align:center;"| My VH1 Music Award for Is It Hot In Here Or Is It Just My Video?
| 
|-
| style="text-align:center;"| There's No "I" in Team (Best Collaboration) 
| 
|-

|}

VH1 Hip Hop Honors Awards

|-

| style="text-align:center;"| 2008
 	
| style="text-align:center;"|  Herself
	
| style="text-align:center;"| Hip Hop Honors
	
|
|-

| style="text-align:center;"| 2016
 	
| style="text-align:center;"|  Herself
	
| style="text-align:center;"| Hip Hop Honors
	
|	
|}

VIVA Comet Media Awards

|-
|rowspan="1"|1997
|rowspan="1"|"The Rain (Supa Dupa Fly)"
|rowspan="2"|Best International Video
| 
|-
|rowspan="2"|2001
|rowspan="1"|"Get Ur Freak On"
| 
|-
|rowspan="2"|Herself
|rowspan="2"|International Hip-Hop 
| 
|-
|rowspan="1"|2003
|
|-

|}

Vibe Awards

|-
|rowspan="2"|2003
| "Work It"
| Reelist Video
| 
|-
| Herself
| Artist of the Year
| 
|-
|rowspan="1"|2005
| "Lose Control"
| Reelist Video
| 
|}

Wild Writings Online Awards

|-
|rowspan="1"|2003
| This Is Not a Test!
| Album of the Year Hip-Hop/Rap
| 
|-
|}

References

Awards
Elliott, Missy